Road King or Road Kings may refer to:

 Road King (Transformers),  a fictional character from the Transformers series
 Road King FLHR, in the Harley-Davidson FL family of motorcycles
 Road Kings (pinball), a pinball machine made by Williams
Road Kings, rockabilly band Jesse Dayton